Mæl Church is a parish church of the Church of Norway in Tinn Municipality in Vestfold og Telemark county, Norway. It is located in the village of Miland. It is one of the churches for the Tinn parish which is part of the Øvre Telemark prosti (deanery) in the Diocese of Agder og Telemark. The white, wooden church was built in a long church design in 1839 using plans drawn up by the architect Hans Linstow. The church seats about 120 people.

History
The earliest existing historical records of the church date back to the year 1358, but the church was not built that year. The first Mæl Church was a wooden stave church that was likely built during the 12th century. By the early 19th century, the old stave church had fallen into disrepair and it was decided to replace the old church. A new church was built immediately north of the old church by master builder Gunleik Ingolfsland who based it off drawings by the architect Hans Linstow. The church was consecrated on 25 August 1839 after three years of construction. After the new church was put into use, the old stave church was demolished. Mæl church is a snall, wooden long church. In 1916-1918, the church porch was rebuilt, a sacristy was added, and the church redecorated. Also there was a major restoration in 1973-1974 according to plans by Stephan Tschudi-Madsen, the interior colors were returned to the original.

Media gallery

See also
List of churches in Agder og Telemark

References

Tinn
Churches in Vestfold og Telemark
Long churches in Norway
Wooden churches in Norway
19th-century Church of Norway church buildings
Churches completed in 1839
12th-century establishments in Norway